{{Speciesbox
| image = 
| image2 = 
| taxon = Acraea peetersi
| authority = Pierre, 1992<ref>Pierre, J. 1992 Une nouvelle espece dAcraea (Lepidoptera Nymphalidae). Lambillionea 92 (4): 308-310.</ref>
| synonyms =
}}Acraea peetersi''''' is a butterfly in the family Nymphalidae. It is found in the Central African Republic. -   but see also Pierre & Bernaud, 2014 for taxonomy.

References

External links

 Images representing  Acraea peetersi at Bold

Butterflies described in 1992
peetersi
Endemic fauna of the Central African Republic
Butterflies of Africa